is a railway station on the Karatsu Line operated by JR Kyushu located in Karatsu, Saga Prefecture, Japan.

Lines

Station layout 
The station, which is unstaffed, consists of an island platform serving two tracks at grade. There is no station building, only a shelter on the platform for waiting passengers. Access to the island platform is by means of a level crossing with steps at the platform end. A bike shed is provided near the station entrance.

Adjacent stations

History 
On 23 February 1902, the company, now renamed the Karatsu Railway, merged with the Kyushu Railway. When the Kyushu Railway was nationalized on 1 July 1907, Japanese Government Railways (JGR) took over control of the station. On 12 October 1909, the line which served the station was designated the Karatsu Line. With the privatization of Japanese National Railways (JNR), the successor of JGR, on 1 April 1987, control of the station passed to JR Kyushu.

Passenger statistics
In fiscal 2015, there were a total of 36,601 boarding passengers, giving a daily average of 100 passengers.

Surrounding area
National Route 202

References

External links
Onizuka Station (JR Kyushu)

Railway stations in Saga Prefecture
Stations of Kyushu Railway Company
Karatsu Line
Railway stations in Japan opened in 1899